The 2002 Nottingham Open (known for sponsorship reasons and the Samsung Open) was a men's tennis tournament played on grass courts at the Nottingham Tennis Centre in Nottingham in the United Kingdom and was part of the International Series of the 2002 ATP Tour. It was the 13th edition of the tournament and ran from 17 June through 23 June 2002. Jonas Björkman won the singles title.

Finals

Singles

 Jonas Björkman defeated  Wayne Arthurs 6–2, 6–7(5–7), 6–2
 It was Björkman's 3rd title of the year and the 32nd of his career.

Doubles

 Mike Bryan /  Mark Knowles defeated  Donald Johnson /  Jared Palmer 0–6, 7–6(7–3), 6–4
 It was Bryan's 3rd title of the year and the 7th of his career. It was Knowles' 5th title of the year and the 22nd of his career.

References

External links
 ITF tournament edition details

Nottingham Open
Nottingham Open